Elba Ramalho (born August 17, 1951, in Conceição, Paraíba) is a Brazilian songwriter, performer, poet and actress. She is sometimes called "The Queen of Forró".

In addition to her successful solo career, Elba has collaborated with a number of well-established Brazilian acts, including Alceu Valença and her first cousin Zé Ramalho.

In 2019, her album O Ouro do Pó da Estrada was nominated for the Latin Grammy Award for Best Portuguese Language Roots Album. On 2021, she received another nomination for the same category, this time for the album Eu e Vocês.

Discography

Guest performances 
 Edu Falaschi - Vera Cruz (2021; vocals on "Rainha do Luar")

References

External links 
 Official Site (Portuguese)
 
 
 Elba Ramalho biography at VH1

1951 births
Living people
Brazilian actresses
20th-century Brazilian women singers
20th-century Brazilian singers
21st-century Brazilian women singers
21st-century Brazilian singers
Latin Grammy Award winners
People from Paraíba
Brazilian women singer-songwriters
Women in Latin music